Bothynoderes is a genus of beetles belonging to the family Curculionidae.

The species of this genus are found in Europe.

Species:
 Bothynoderes affinis (Schrank, 1781)

References

Lixinae
Curculionidae genera